The 1976 United States Senate election in Nevada was held on November 2, 1976. Incumbent Democratic U.S. Senator Howard Cannon won re-election to a fourth term.

General election

Candidates
Dan Becan (Libertarian)
Howard Cannon, incumbent U.S. Senator (Democratic)
David Towell, former U.S. Representative from Nevada's At-large congressional district (Republican)
Byron D. Young (Independent American)

Campaign
In the Senate, Cannon was known as a moderate in the Democratic Party. He served as chairman of several committees, including the rules committee and the inaugural arrangements committee. Cannon was nearly defeated for re-election in 1964 by Republican Lieutenant Governor Paul Laxalt in one of the closest elections in history. However, he became more popular over the next few years and won re-election in 1970 with nearly 58% of the vote. In 1976, he faced former U.S. Representative David Towell, who served just one term in the U.S. House of Representatives before losing reelection, then running for the Senate. Cannon won re-election with 63% of the vote, one of his best election performances of his career. He won every county in the state, except for Eureka County, which Towell won with just 51% of the vote.

Results

See also 
 1976 United States Senate elections

References

Nevada
1976
1976 Nevada elections